Monan is a town under the administration of Xian County in east-central Hebei province, China, located  northwest of the county seat and near the border between the prefecture-level cities of Cangzhou and Hengshui. , it has 33 villages under its administration.

See also
List of township-level divisions of Hebei

References

Township-level divisions of Hebei